Club Voleibol Almería, also known for sponsorship reasons as Unicaja Almería, is a professional volleyball team based in Almeria, Spain. It plays in the top flight of Spanish volleyball, Superliga.

Honors
Superliga : 12
1997, 1998, 2000, 2001, 2002, 2003, 2004, 2005, 2013, 2015, 2016, 2022
Copa del Rey : 11
1995, 1998, 1999, 2000, 2002, 2007, 2009, 2010, 2014, 2016, 2019
Spain's supercup : 8
1995, 2002, 2003, 2006, 2010, 2011, 2015, 2022

2013–14 season squad

External links
CV Almería official website

Almeria
Almeria
Volleyball clubs established in 1986
Sport in Almería
1986 establishments in Spain